The Roewe 360 is a compact sedan by Roewe's sub-brand, SAIC.

Overview
The Roewe 360 was introduced in 2015 as the successor of the Roewe 350 compact sedan. Since SAIC can use GM engines and transmissions under a deal agreed in 2014, the Roewe 360 shares the same engine and transmission as the Chevrolet Cruze, which is also sold by SAIC in China.

Roewe 360 Plus
The Roewe 360 received a minor facelift in 2017. Its front bumpers, headlamps, and grilles were redesigned in line with the updated Roewe product line, creating a front fascia similar to those of the Roewe RX3, Roewe RX5, Roewe i6 and the facelifted Roewe 950.

According to the official website, the model was named the 360 Plus, and was priced slightly higher than the regular 360.

References

External links

Roewe Website 

360
Cars introduced in 2015
Compact cars
Cars of China
Front-wheel-drive vehicles